is the railway station in Koura-men, Saza Town, Nagasaki Prefecture. It is operated by Matsuura Railway and is on the Nishi-Kyūshū Line.

Lines
Matsuura Railway
Nishi-Kyūshū Line

Adjacent stations

Station layout
The station is on a ground level with a single side platform.

Environs
Koura Post Office
Sasebo Advanced Technical College
Saihi Motor Hokubu Office
Sun-Village Saza

History
August 29, 1931 - Opens for business by Sasebo Railway.
October 1, 1936 - The Railroad Ministry nationalizes all of Sasebo Railway, this station becomes a station of the JGR Matsuura Line.
March 1, 1945 - This station moved to the current position..
April 1, 1987 - Railways privatize and this station is inherited by JR Kyushu.
April 1, 1988 - This station is inherited by Matsuura Railway.

References
Nagasaki statistical yearbook (Nagasaki prefectural office statistics section,Japanese)

External links
Matsuura Railway (Japanese)

Railway stations in Japan opened in 1931
Railway stations in Nagasaki Prefecture